Stuck was a form occasionally found in English writing as a corruption of the German "Stück", itself an abbreviation of Stückfass (formerly written Stückfaß), referring to the volume of a wine cask of around 1000-1200 litres. It was normally used in reference to German wine production.

References

Imperial units
Units of volume